Renegade Racers is a racing video game developed and published by Interplay for PlayStation and Microsoft Windows in 1999–2000. A Dreamcast port had been planned but was eventually canceled.

Reception

The PC version received average reviews according to the review aggregation website GameRankings.

References

External links
 

1999 video games
Cancelled Dreamcast games
Interplay Entertainment games
PlayStation (console) games
Racing video games
Windows games
Video games developed in the United States